Dimethyltryptamine-N-oxide (DMT-N-oxide) is a dimethyltryptamine metabolite.

References

Tryptamines
Amine oxides